The following outline is provided as an overview of and introduction to rights:

Rights – normative principles, variously construed as legal, social, or moral freedoms or entitlements.

Theoretical distinctions
 Natural and legal rights
 Natural law
 Positive law
 Social rights
 Social contract
 Claim rights and liberty rights
 Claim
 Entitlement
 Liberty
 Freedom
 Negative and positive rights
 Individual rights
 Group rights

Other divisions
 Three generations of human rights
 Civil and political rights and Economic, social and cultural rights

By claimant
 Animal rights
 Human rights
 Men's rights
 Fathers' rights
 Women's rights
 Mothers' rights
 Children's rights
 List of children's rights topics
 Youth rights
 List of youth rights topics
 Fetal rights
 Student rights
 Indigenous rights
 Minority rights
 LGBT rights

Exclusive rights
 Intellectual property rights
 Authors' rights
 Copyright
 Industrial design rights
 Patent rights
 Trademarks
 Property rights

Other types

 Digital rights (rights to use digital resources)
 Labor rights
 Linguistic rights
 Reproductive rights
 Right to arms
 Disability rights
 Marital rights
 Prisoners' rights
 Prisoner of war
 Right to life
 Right to die
 Divine Right of Kings
 Unenumerated rights
 Equal rights
 Fundamental rights
 Right to vote
 Right of foreigners to vote
 Right of expatriates to vote in their country of origin
 Political freedom
 Freedom of assembly
 Freedom of association
 Freedom of movement
 Freedom of religion
 Freedom of speech
 Freedom of the press
 Freedom of thought
 Freedom from unreasonable searches and seizures, which is related to freedom of privacy
 Suffrage
 Scientific freedom
 Academic freedom
 Habeas corpus
 International law
 Universal Declaration of Human Rights
 International Court of Justice
 Laws of war
 By religion
 Manusmṛti
 Confucianism
 Qur'an
 Ten Commandments
 Bushido
 Juche

History 

History of human rights
 Age of Enlightenment
 Important bills of rights
 Gender or Sex segregation
 Women's suffrage
 Sex segregation and Islam
 Racial segregation
 Racial segregation in the United States
 Civil Rights Movement
 American Indian Movement
 Religious segregation
 Residential segregation

Related concepts

Movements 
 Animal liberation movement
 Carers rights movement
 Children's rights movement
 Civil Rights Movement
 Disability rights movement
 LGBT social movements
 Fathers' rights movement
 Parents' rights movement
 Women's rights movement

Crimes against humanity 

Crime against humanity
 Crime of apartheid
 Genocide
 Slavery
 Torture
 War crimes

Notable people

Lists
 List of civil rights leaders
 List of disability rights activists
 List of LGBT rights activists
 List of opponents of slavery
 List of suffragists and suffragettes
 List of women's rights activists

Individuals 
 Abraham Lincoln
 Andrei Sakharov
 Coretta Scott King
 Eleanor Roosevelt
 Elie Wiesel
 Jimmy Carter
 Margaret Sanger
 Martin Luther King Jr.
 Mohandas Gandhi
 Mikhail Gorbachev
 Nelson Mandela
 Raoul Wallenberg
 Stephen Biko
 John Locke
 Confucius
 Voltaire
 Montesquieu
 Jean-Jacques Rousseau
 Thomas Paine
 John Calvin
 Calvinism
 Five Points of Calvinism

See also 

Ethics
Outline of ethics
Government
Law
Outline of law
Political Science
Rights of Man

External links 

Universal Declaration of Human Rights (UDHR)(1948); United Nations General Assembly.
Stanford Encyclopedia of Philosophy; article by Leif Wenar.
 WikiEd - Teacher's Rights
 International Freedom of Expression Exchange
 Comparative Analysis of Human Rights

Rights
Rights
Human rights